The Santa Maria Sun is an American free weekly newspaper that serves Santa Maria, California and Santa Barbara County,

Edited by Camillia Lanham, the Sun has a paid circulation of 200 copies and a free circulation of 20,000 copies.   The Sun is published on Thursdays.

History 

The Sun was founded in 2000 by Steve Moss, who saw a need for a weekly community newspaper that could act as a “town square where everybody could participate.”

Shortly after its founding,  Lompoc, California Economic Development Committee member Justin Ruhge contributed an controversial editorial to the Nov. 16 issue. It  stated that "Muslims are out to destroy our world."

Steve Moss died in 2005. For fifteen years, Ryan Miller edited the Sun.  During the 2005 Michael Jackson trial in Santa Maria, Miller provided local commentary for national and international news outlets. Miller left the Sun in 2015.

Awards

In 2013, the Sun won an award for its investigation of a corrections officer's death at the Federal Correctional Institution, Lompoc . The sun uncovered a pattern of administrative malfeasance and abuse that may have contributed to the death of two corrections officers.

In 2017, the  Sun won second place in the General Excellence category in its division of  California's Better Newspapers Contest, with judges citing its "mix of coverage of local issues, arts and culture". In 2017, the Sun took home awards including first place for agricultural reporting, enterprise news reporting, feature stories, and news photography.

References

Weekly newspapers published in California
Santa Barbara County, California